Vitamin D toxicity, or hypervitaminosis D is the toxic state of an excess of vitamin D. The normal range for blood concentration is 20 to 50 nanograms per milliliter (ng/mL).  However, the toxic state is known to be a value of 100 ng/ml or more in a clinical setting.

Signs and symptoms 
An excess of vitamin D causes abnormally high blood concentrations of calcium, which can cause overcalcification of the bones, soft tissues, heart and kidneys. In addition, hypertension can result. Symptoms of vitamin D toxicity may include the following:

 Dehydration
 Vomiting
 Diarrhea
 Decreased appetite
 Irritability
 Constipation
 Fatigue
 Muscle weakness
Metastatic calcification of the soft tissues
 Insomnia

Symptoms of vitamin D toxicity appear several months after excessive doses of vitamin D are administered. In almost every case, a low-calcium diet combined with corticosteroid drugs will allow for a full recovery within a month. It is possible that some of the symptoms of vitamin D toxicity are actually due to vitamin K depletion. One animal experiment has demonstrated that co-consumption with vitamin K reduced adverse effects, but this has not been tested in humans. However the interconnected relationships between vitamin A, vitamin D, and vitamin K, outlined in a 2007 paper published in the journal Medical Hypotheses, describes potential feedback loops between these three vitamins that could be elucidated by future research.

A mutation of the CYP24A1 gene can lead to a reduction in the degradation of vitamin D and to hypercalcaemia (see Vitamin_D: Excess).

Recommended supplement limits
The U.S National Academy of Medicine has established a Tolerable Upper Intake Level (UL) to protect against vitamin D toxicity ("The UL is not intended as a target intake; rather, the risk for harm begins to increase once intakes surpass this level."). These levels in microgram (mcg or µg) and International Units (IU) for both males and females, by age, are:
(Conversion : 1 µg = 40 IU and 0.025 µg = 1 IU.)
 0–6 months: 25 µg/d (1000 IU/d)
 7–12 months: 38 µg/d (1500 IU/d)
 1–3 years: 63 µg/d (2500 IU/d)
 4–8 years:75 µg/d (3000 IU/d)
 9+ years:100 µg/d (4000 IU/d)
 Pregnant and Lactating: 100 µg/d (4000 IU/d)

The recommended dietary allowance is 15 µg/d (600 IU per day; 800 IU for those over 70 years). Overdose has been observed at 1,925 µg/d (77,000 IU per day). Acute overdose requires between 15,000 µg/d (600,000 IU per day) and 42,000 µg/d (1,680,000 IU per day) over a period of several days to months.

Suggested tolerable upper intake level
Based on risk assessment, a safe upper intake level of 250 µg (10,000 IU) per day in healthy adults has been suggested by non-government authors.

Long-term effects of supplementary oral intake
Excessive exposure to sunlight poses no risk in vitamin D toxicity through overproduction of vitamin D precursor, cholecalciferol, regulating vitamin D production. During ultraviolet exposure, the concentration of vitamin D precursors produced in the skin reaches an equilibrium, and any further vitamin D that is produced is degraded. This process is less efficient with increased melanin pigmentation in the skin. Endogenous production with full body exposure to sunlight is comparable to taking an oral dose between 250 µg and 625 µg (10,000 IU and 25,000 IU) per day.

Vitamin D oral supplementation and skin synthesis have a different effect on the transport form of vitamin D, plasma calcifediol concentrations. Endogenously synthesized vitamin D3 travels mainly with vitamin D-binding protein (DBP), which slows hepatic delivery of vitamin D and the availability in the plasma. In contrast, orally administered vitamin D produces rapid hepatic delivery of vitamin D and increases plasma calcifediol.

It has been questioned whether to ascribe a state of sub-optimal vitamin D status when the annual variation in ultraviolet will naturally produce a period of falling levels, and such a seasonal decline has been a part of Europeans' adaptive environment for 1000 generations. Still more contentious is recommending supplementation when those supposedly in need of it are labeled healthy and serious doubts exist as to the long-term effect of attaining and maintaining serum 25(OH)D of at least 80nmol/L by supplementation.

Current theories of the mechanism behind vitamin D toxicity (starting at a plasmatic concentration of ≈750 nmol/L) propose that:
 Intake of vitamin D raises calcitriol concentrations in the plasma and cell
 Intake of vitamin D raises plasma calcifediol concentrations which exceed the binding capacity of the DBP, and free calcifediol enters the cell
 Intake of vitamin D raises the concentration of vitamin D metabolites which exceed DBP binding capacity and free calcitriol enters the cell

All of these affect gene transcription and overwhelm the vitamin D signal transduction process, leading to vitamin D toxicity.

Cardiovascular disease 
Evidence suggests that dietary vitamin D may be carried by lipoprotein particles into cells of the artery wall and atherosclerotic plaque, where it may be converted to active form by monocyte-macrophages. This raises questions regarding the effects of vitamin D intake on atherosclerotic calcification and cardiovascular risk as it may be causing vascular calcification. Calcifediol is implicated in the etiology of atherosclerosis, especially in non-Whites.

The levels of the active form of vitamin D, calcitriol, are inversely correlated with coronary calcification. Moreover, the active vitamin D analog, alfacalcidol, seems to protect patients from developing vascular calcification. Serum vitamin D has been found to correlate with calcified atherosclerotic plaque in African Americans as they have higher active serum vitamin D levels compared to Euro-Americans. Higher levels of calcidiol positively correlate with aorta and carotid calcified atherosclerotic plaque in African Americans but not with coronary plaque, whereas individuals of European descent have an opposite, negative association. There are racial differences in the association of coronary calcified plaque in that there is less calcified atherosclerotic plaque in the coronary arteries of African-Americans than in whites.

Among descent groups with heavy sun exposure during their evolution, taking supplemental vitamin D to attain the 25(OH)D level associated with optimal health in studies done with mainly European populations may have deleterious outcomes. Despite abundant sunshine in India, vitamin D status in Indians is low and suggests a public health need to fortify Indian foods with vitamin D. However, the levels found in India are consistent with many other studies of tropical populations which have found that even an extreme amount of sun exposure, does not raise 25(OH)D levels to the levels typically found in Europeans.

Recommendations stemming for a single standard for optimal serum 25(OH)D concentrations ignores the differing genetically mediated determinates of serum 25(OH)D and may result in ethnic minorities in Western countries having the results of studies done with subjects not representative of ethnic diversity applied to them. Vitamin D levels vary for genetically mediated reasons as well as environmental ones.

Ethnic differences
Possible ethnic differences in physiological pathways for ingested vitamin D, such as the Inuit, may confound across the board recommendations for vitamin D levels. Inuit compensate for lower production of vitamin D by converting more of this vitamin to its most active form.

A Toronto study of young Canadians of diverse ancestry applied a standard of serum 25(OH)D levels that was significantly higher than official recommendations. These levels were described to be 75 nmol/L as "optimal", between 75 nmol/L and 50 nmol/L as "insufficient" and < 50 nmol/L as "deficient". 22% of individuals of European ancestry had 25(OH)D levels less than the 40 nmol/L cutoff, comparable to the values observed in previous studies (40nmol/L is 15 ng/mL). 78% of individuals of East Asian ancestry and 77% of individuals of South Asian ancestry had 25(OH)D concentrations lower than 40 nmol/L. The East Asians in the Toronto sample had low 25(OH)D levels when compared to whites. In a Chinese population at particular risk for esophageal cancer and with the high serum 25(OH)D concentrations have a significantly increased risk of the precursor lesion.

Studies on the South Asian population uniformly point to low 25(OH)D levels, despite abundant sunshine. Rural men around Delhi average 44 nmol/L. Healthy Indians seem have low 25(OH)D levels which are not very different from healthy South Asians living in Canada. Measuring melanin content to assess skin pigmentation showed an inverse relationship with serum 25(OH)D. The uniform occurrence of very low serum 25(OH)D in Indians living in India and Chinese in China does not support the hypothesis that the low levels seen in the more pigmented are due to lack of synthesis from the sun at higher latitudes.

Premature aging

Complex regulatory mechanisms control metabolism. Recent epidemiologic evidence suggests that there is a narrow range of vitamin D levels in which vascular function is optimized. Animal research suggests that both excess and deficiency of vitamin D appears to cause abnormal functioning and premature aging.

Case reports
In 2022, a man suffered from severe Vitamin D toxicity for three months.

Use as rodenticide 

Vitamin D is also used as a rodenticide. Rats and mice that consume the bait develop vitamin D overdose and die from hypercalcemia. Strengths used in acute baits are 0.075% (3,000,000 IU/g) for D3 and 0.01% (4,000,000 IU/g) for D2. Death happens several days after a single intake.

See also 

 Hypervitaminosis
 Vitamin D and neurology
 Vitamin D deficiency

References

External links 

Vitamin D
Effects of external causes
Hypervitaminosis